Henry Bradstreet Cleaves (February 6, 1840 – June 22, 1912) was an American politician and the 43rd Governor of Maine from 1893 to 1897.

Early life
Cleaves was born in Bridgton, Maine on February 6, 1840 to Thomas Cleaves and Sophia Bradstreet Cleaves. He had 4 siblings, including future judge Nathan. He studied at local schools and Bridgton Academy.

American Civil War
Cleaves served during the American Civil War. He enlisted in the summer of 1862, as a private soldier in Company B, 23d Maine Volunteers, under Col. William Wirt Virgin, later a justice of the Supreme Judicial Court of Maine. Cleaves attained the rank of lieutenant by time he was mustered out of service.

Politics
After the Civil War, he returned to Bridgton and was involved in his family's farm as well as in the lumber business. In 1868, he began studying law and he was admitted to the bar in September 1869. He had a successful legal career in Portland, Maine.

Cleaves was elected to the Maine House of Representatives in 1876 and again in 1877 as a representative from Portland. He was chosen as chair of the House Judiciary Committee. Leaving the Legislature, he then served as the city solicitor for Portland (1877–1879), and as the Maine Attorney General from 1880 to 1884. At the 1892 Maine Republican Party convention held in Portland, he was unanimously selected as the Party's nominee for governor. He was elected in the September 1892 general election by a popular vote and was sworn in as governor on January 4, 1893. He won the re-election in 1894. During his administration, problems resulting from the national economic depression in 1893 were dealt with. He left office on January 2, 1897.

Cleaves died on June 22, 1912 at the age of 72.

References

 Sobel, Robert and John Raimo. Biographical Directory of the Governors of the United States, 1789-1978. Greenwood Press, 1988.

External links
 

1840 births
1912 deaths
People from Bridgton, Maine
People of Maine in the American Civil War
Politicians from Portland, Maine
Union Army officers
Maine lawyers
Republican Party members of the Maine House of Representatives
Maine Attorneys General
Republican Party governors of Maine
19th-century American politicians
19th-century American lawyers